The Sizzlers massacre took place in Sea Point, Cape Town on 20 January 2003. Nine people were murdered and one person was severely injured in a hate crime against the queer community. 
The victims were shot and killed at a gay massage parlour named Sizzlers at 7 Graham Road. Adam Roy Woest and Trevor Basil Theys were convicted for the crime. Woest stated that the initial reason for targeting the massage parlour was to rob it and steal money that Woest and Theys believed was held onsite. Judge Nathan Erasmus described it as the "worst massacre that Cape Town and the country has ever seen."

See also 
 List of massacres in South Africa

References 

2003 in LGBT history
Massacres in 2003
January 2003 events in South Africa
2000s in Cape Town
Massacres of men
Violence against gay men
Violence against men in Africa
Events in Cape Town
2003 murders in South Africa
Western Cape
Crime in Cape Town
2000s massacres in South Africa